PIB may refer for:

Music
 "Plug In Baby", a song by UK alternative rock band Muse
 Purified in Blood (PiB), a Norwegian band

Organisations
 Papuan Infantry Battalion
 Press Information Bureau, Government of India
 Pakistanis in the Bay, Organization started by 3 highschooler to build a community.

Places
 Pir Ilahi Buksh Colony (PIB Colony), Sindh, Pakistan
 Hattiesburg–Laurel Regional Airport (IATA airport code: PIB)

Science and technology
 Particle in a box (PIB), a model quantum mechanical system
 Pebibyte (PiB), a unit of digital information storage
 Pittsburgh compound B (PiB), chemical used in studying Alzheimer's Disease
 Polyisobutylene or polyisobutene, a synthetic rubber

See also
 Píib or pib, a Mayan earth oven
 Pib and Pog, an animated film
 Permanent interest bearing shares (PIBS), a fixed-interest securities issued by UK building societies